The Commandant of the Indian Military Academy is a post created in 1932 for the purpose of leading the Indian Military Academy in its education of "gentleman cadets". The Commandant must hold a rank of lieutenant general (three star equivalent) or above. There is no minimum nor maximum term of service in this position though in practice commandants have served anywhere from a few months to 4 years in the position.

History
General Philip Chetwode chose Brig LP Collins (4 Gurkhas) as the first commandant. Brig LP Collins had the task of first acquiring the campus from the railways in Dehradun, and then converting it into an army training institution, taking ten months to do so. On 1 October 1932, the raising day, Brig LP Collins issued a Special Order of the Day "The Indian Military Academy opens with effect from today [...]." 

There were a total of 5 British commandants including Brig LP Collins, after which Brig Thakur Mahadeo Singh was appointed as the first Commandant of Indian descent post-independence in 1947. Brig Thakur Mahadeo Singh was followed by Maj Gen KS Thimayya who became the first IMA Commandant to go on to become the Chief of Army Staff in India. Brigadier M.M. Khanna was the first alumni of IMA alumni to be appointed Commandant.

Following a recommendation in 1983 by the Ministry of Defence the need was felt that cadets needed to know about application of science in weaponry. Lt Gen Mathew Thomas and all following commandants took note of these changes and implemented them. Lt Gen M Thomas also suggested a change in syllabus, proposing new computer focused teaching methods as well as further emphasis on advanced training. This included sending cadets to the High Altitude Warfare School and the Counter Insurgency and Jungle Warfare School among other things. Commandant Lt Gen Himmeth Singh appreciated the difficulties of modern warfare, but emphasized the human factor. His outline of teaching is as follows:

Commandants 

There have been a total of 49 Commandants so far:

See also 

 Commandant of the National Defence College
 Commandant of the National Defence Academy
 Commandant of Indian Naval Academy
 Commandant of the Air Force Academy

References

Bibliography 

 

Indian Army
Military academies of India
Military academies
Indian military appointments
Indian Army appointments